The 1983 All-Ireland Senior Camogie Championship was won by Cork, beating Dublin by a two-point margin in the final.

Arrangement
A record eleven counties participated in the championship, the highest number since the separation of senior and junior championships in 1968. Antrim withdrew from the championship and gave a walkover to Cork in their tie scheduled for June 19. Tipperary surprised fancied Galway in the quarter-final.

Final
Claire Kelleher scored the clinching goal for Cork five minutes from the end, carrying the ball round the hitherto impenetrable Dublin defence without having the ball tapped off her stick. That score left two points between the sides and although Dublin used all their resources they could not break down the resolute Cork defence. Cork shot a surfeit of wides in the first half and did not get their first score until the 12th minute, when Dublin were three points up. Val Fitzpatrick then hit a cracking shot which Yvonne Redmond could not hold to make it 1-1 to 0-3 and Mary Geaney went on to give Cork the lead for the first time.

Final stages

MATCH RULES
50 minutes
Replay if scores level
Maximum of 3 substitutions

See also
 All-Ireland Senior Hurling Championship
 Wikipedia List of Camogie players
 National Camogie League
 Camogie All Stars Awards
 Ashbourne Cup

References

External links
 Official Camogie website
 History of Camogie senior championship slideshow. presented by Cumann Camógaíochta Communications Committee at GAA Museum January 25, 2010 part one, part two, part three and part four
 Historic newspaper reports of All Ireland finals
 Camogie on official GAA website
 Timeline: History of Camogie
 Camogie on GAA Oral History Project
 Camogie Websites for Antrim and Dublin

1983 in camogie
1983